Nicholas Haden-Guest (born May 5, 1951), known as Nicholas Guest, is an American actor who has appeared in various movie and television roles, including that of headmaster Patrick James Elliot in the teen sitcom USA High. Since 2000, he has primarily worked as a voice actor.

Personal life 
Guest was born in New York City, the son of Peter Haden-Guest, a British United Nations diplomat who later became the 4th Baron Haden-Guest, and his second wife, Jean Pauline Hindes, a former vice president of casting at CBS. Guest's maternal grandparents were Jewish immigrants from Russia. His paternal grandfather, the 1st Baron Haden-Guest, was a Labour Party politician who was a convert to Judaism, and his paternal grandmother's father was Colonel Albert Goldsmid, a British officer who founded the Jewish Lads' and Girls' Brigade and the Maccabaeans. Both of Guest's parents had become atheists, and Guest had no religious upbringing. More than a decade before he was born, his uncle David Guest, a lecturer and Communist Party member, was killed in the Spanish Civil War fighting in the International Brigades.

Nicholas Guest spent parts of his childhood in the United Kingdom. He is the brother of actor Christopher Guest, the brother-in-law of actress Jamie Lee Curtis and the half brother of the British-American writer Anthony Haden-Guest.

Guest married Jill Ellen Demby on May 11, 1980, but they divorced in 1989. With Demby he had his first daughter, Julia Demby Haden-Guest (born on September 23, 1988). On November 26, 1989, he married Pamela Ann Guest (née Seamon), an actress and casting director, with whom he had his second daughter, Elizabeth Ann Haden-Guest (born on May 30, 1990), also an actress.

Family title 
Guest is heir presumptive to the title of Baron Haden-Guest in the British peerage. This is because the children of his brother Christopher Guest and Jamie Lee Curtis (Lord and Lady Haden-Guest), Annie Guest and Ruby Guest, are ineligible to succeed to the title, being adopted. Should he succeed to the barony, he will  be the 6th Baron Haden-Guest. As the child of a baron, he is styled "The Honourable Nicholas Guest".

Filmography

Animation 
 Rave Master as Hebi (English dub)
 The Big O as Army Police (English dub)
 The Mummy as Ardeth Bay
 Ben 10 as Clancy
 Justice League as Luminus
 Justice League Unlimited as Dino Trooper
 Roughnecks: Starship Troopers Chronicles as Lieutenant / Major Zander Barcalow
 Godzilla: The Series as Chad Gordon
 Batman: The Brave and the Bold as The Question, Martian Manhunter

Live-action roles 
 Power Rangers Time Force as Taylor
 Building Manintenance: and a home man as Nicholas
 Sons of Anarchy as Voice of John Teller
 Sleepy Hollow as General William Howe, 2015 2 episodes

Movie roles 
 1980 The Long Riders as Robert Ford
 1982 Star Trek II: The Wrath of Khan as Cadet
 1983 Trading Places as Harry (one of Louis Winthorpe III's preppy friends)
 1984 Cloak and Dagger as Taxi Driver
 1984 Nausicaa of the Valley of the Wind as Additional Voices (2005 Disney dub)
 1988 Appointment with Death as Lennox Boynton
 1989 National Lampoon's Christmas Vacation as Todd Chester (the Griswolds' next-door neighbor)
 1989 Tunnels as Ron Bellard
 1993 Brainsmasher...A Love Story as Detective Smith
 1993 The Joy Luck Club as The Hairdresser
 1994 Kickboxer 4: The Aggressor as DEA Agent Casey Ford
 1995 The Land Before Time III: The Time of the Great Giving as Hyp's Father
 1996 The Late Shift as Robert Iger
 1998 Twice Upon a Time as Bed & Breakfast Manager
 2001 Cowboy Bebop: The Movie as Rasheed
 2003 Terminator 3: Rise of the Machines as Additional Voices
 2003 The Tale of Despereaux as Additional Voices
 2005 Racing Stripes as Additional Voices
 2006 Barnyard as Additional Barnyard Voices
 2006 Over the Hedge as Additional Voices
 2008 Fly Me to the Moon as Fly Buddy
 2009 Astro Boy as French Waiter Robot
 2010 Dante's Inferno: An Animated Epic as Demon Priest
 2010 Tangled as Additional Voices
 2011 Rio as Additional Voices
 2012 ParaNorman as Hippie Ghost / Mobster Ghost
 2013 Frozen as Additional Voices
 2013 Saving Santa as Blitzen, Shortbeard
 2014 Big Hero 6 as Additional Voices
 2014 Mr. Peabody & Sherman as French Peasant
 2014 Penguins of Madagascar as Flight Attendant
 2016 Zootopia as Judy's Grandfather (deleted scene)
 2018 Scooby-Doo! & Batman: The Brave and the Bold as Martian Manhunter

Music video
 1989 Janie's Got a Gun by Aerosmith, as Father

Video games 
 1993 Freddy Pharkas: Frontier Pharmacist as Srini / Hop Singh
 1996 The Jungle Book as Sergeant Polk
 2000 Vampire: The Masquerade - Redemption as Christof Romuald
 2002 Star Trek: Bridge Commander as Lt. Felix Savali
 2014 Titanfall 2 as General Marder

References

External links 

1951 births
Living people
20th-century American male actors
21st-century American male actors
Male actors from New York City
American male film actors
American male television actors
American people of English descent
American people of Russian-Jewish descent
American male voice actors
Jewish American male actors
Younger sons of barons
Nicholas